Point Pleasant Historic District is a national historic district located at Point Pleasant, Mason County, West Virginia.  The district includes 93 contributing buildings and one contributing site in Point Pleasant's central business district and surrounding residential areas. They are in a variety of late 19th- and early 20th-century architectural styles. Notable buildings include the Mansion House (1796), The Church of Christ in Christian Union (1840), Odd Fellows Hall (c. 1906), The Presbyterian Church (1926), Christ Episcopal Church (1869-1873), "Hooff's Opera House" (1905), Pioneer Cemetery, U.S. Post Office Building (1913), and the Poffenbarger House.  The Point Pleasant Battleground is located in the district and listed separately on the National Register of Historic Places.

It was listed on the National Register of Historic Places in 1985.

References

External links

National Register of Historic Places in Mason County, West Virginia
Historic districts in Mason County, West Virginia
Federal architecture in West Virginia
Victorian architecture in West Virginia
Buildings and structures in Mason County, West Virginia
Historic American Buildings Survey in West Virginia
Historic districts on the National Register of Historic Places in West Virginia
Point Pleasant, West Virginia